Brighton is a town in the Canadian province of Newfoundland and Labrador.

Demographics 

See also
 List of cities and towns in Newfoundland and Labrador

References

Towns in Newfoundland and Labrador